Heraclius (c. 575 – 11 February 641) was Eastern Roman emperor from 610 to 641. His rise to power began in 608, when he and his father, Heraclius the Elder, the exarch of Africa, led a revolt against the unpopular usurper Phocas.

Heraclius's reign was marked by several military campaigns. The year Heraclius came to power, the empire was threatened on multiple frontiers. Heraclius immediately took charge of the Byzantine–Sasanian War of 602–628. The first battles of the campaign ended in defeat for the Byzantines; the Persian army fought their way to the Bosphorus but Constantinople was protected by impenetrable walls and a strong navy, and Heraclius was able to avoid total defeat. Soon after, he initiated reforms to rebuild and strengthen the military. Heraclius drove the Persians out of Asia Minor and pushed deep into their territory, defeating them decisively in 627 at the Battle of Nineveh. The Persian Shah Khosrow II was overthrown and executed by his son Kavad II, who soon sued for a peace treaty, agreeing to withdraw from all occupied territory. This way peaceful relations were restored to the two deeply strained empires.

However, Heraclius soon lost many of his newly regained lands to the Rashidun Caliphate. Emerging from the Arabian Peninsula, the Muslims quickly conquered the Sasanian Empire. In 636, the Muslims marched into Roman Syria, defeating Heraclius's brother Theodore. Within a short period of time, the Arabs conquered Mesopotamia, Armenia and Egypt. Heraclius responded with reforms which allowed his successors to combat the Arabs and avoid total destruction.

Heraclius entered diplomatic relations with the Croats and Serbs in the Balkans. He tried to repair the schism in the Christian church in regard to the Monophysites, by promoting a compromise doctrine called Monothelitism. The Church of the East (commonly called Nestorian) was also involved in the process. Eventually this project of unity was rejected by all sides of the dispute.

Origins
Heraclius was the eldest son of Heraclius the Elder and Epiphania. His father, Heraclius the Elder, is almost universally recognized as being of Armenian origin. His mother, Epiphania, was probably of Cappadocian origin. Walter Kaegi considers Heracliusʼ Armenian origin "probable" and speculates that he was presumably "bilingual (Armenian and Greek) from an early age, but even this is uncertain." According to  the 7th century Armenian historian Sebeos, Heraclius was related to the Arsacid dynasty of Armenia. Elizabeth Redgate considers his Armenian origin likely. However, Anthony Kaldellis argues that there is not a single primary source that says that Heraclius [the Elder] was an Armenian and that the assertion is based on an erroneous reading of Theophylact Simocatta. In a letter, Priscus, a general who had replaced Heraclius the Elder, wrote to him "to leave the army and return to his own city in Armenia". Kaldellis interprets it as the command headquarters of Heraclius the Elder, and not his home town. Nevertheless, beyond that, there is little specific information known about his origin. His father was a key general during Emperor Maurice's war with Shah Bahram Chobin, usurper of the Sasanian Empire, during 590.  After the war, Maurice appointed Heraclius the Elder to the position of Exarch of Africa.

Early life

Revolt against Phocas and accession

In 608, Heraclius the Elder renounced his loyalty to the Emperor Phocas, who had overthrown Maurice six years earlier. The rebels issued coins showing both Heraclii dressed as hypatos, though neither of them explicitly claimed the imperial title at this time. Heraclius's younger cousin Nicetas launched an overland invasion of Egypt; by 609, he had defeated Phocas's general Bonosus and secured the province. Meanwhile, the younger Heraclius sailed eastward with another force via Sicily and Cyprus.

As he approached Constantinople, he made contact with prominent leaders and planned an attack to overthrow aristocrats in the city. When he reached the capital, the Excubitors, an elite Imperial Guard unit led by Phocas's son-in-law Priscus, deserted to Heraclius, and he entered the city without serious resistance. When Heraclius captured Phocas, he asked him "Is this how you have ruled, wretch?" Phocas's reply—"And will you rule better?"—so enraged Heraclius that he beheaded Phocas on the spot. He later had the genitalia removed from the body because Phocas had raped the wife of Photius, a powerful politician in the city.

On 5 October 610, Heraclius was crowned in the Chapel of St. Stephen within the Great Palace. He then married Fabia, who took the name Eudokia. After her death in 612, he married his niece Martina in 613; this second marriage was considered incestuous and was very unpopular. In the reign of Heraclius's two sons, the divisive Martina was to become the center of power and political intrigue. Despite widespread hatred for Martina in Constantinople, Heraclius took her on campaigns with him and refused attempts by Patriarch Sergius to prevent and later dissolve the marriage.

Byzantine–Sasanian War of 602–628

Initial Persian advantage

During his Balkan campaigns, Emperor Maurice and his family were murdered by Phocas in November 602 after a mutiny. Khosrow II (Chosroes) of the Sasanian Empire had been restored to his throne by Maurice, and they had remained allies until the latter's death. Thereafter, Khosrow seized the opportunity to attack the Byzantine Empire and reconquer Mesopotamia. Khosrow had at his court a man who claimed to be Maurice's son Theodosius, and Khosrow demanded that the Byzantines accept this Theodosius as emperor.

The war initially went the Persians' way, partly because of Phocas's brutal repression and the succession crisis that ensued as the general Heraclius sent his nephew Nicetas to attack Egypt, enabling his son Heraclius the younger to claim the throne in 610. Phocas, an unpopular ruler who is invariably described in historical sources as a "tyrant" (in its original meaning of the word, i.e. illegitimate king by the rules of succession), was eventually deposed by Heraclius, who sailed to Constantinople from Carthage with an icon affixed to the prow of his ship.

By this time, the Persians had conquered Mesopotamia and the Caucasus, and in 611 they overran Syria and entered Anatolia. A major counter-attack led by Heraclius two years later was decisively defeated outside Antioch by Shahrbaraz and Shahin, and the Roman position collapsed; the Persians devastated parts of Asia Minor and captured Chalcedon across from Constantinople on the Bosporus.

Over the following decade the Persians were able to conquer Palestine and Egypt (by mid-621, the whole province was in their hands) and to devastate Anatolia, while the Avars and Slavs took advantage of the situation to overrun the Balkans, bringing the Empire to the brink of destruction. In 613, the Persian army took Damascus with the help of the Jews, seized Jerusalem in 614, damaging the Church of the Holy Sepulchre and capturing the True Cross, and afterwards capturing Egypt in 617 or 618. When the Sasanians reached Chalcedon in 615, it was at this point, according to Sebeos, that Heraclius had agreed to stand down and was about ready to allow the Byzantine Empire to become a Persian client state, even permitting Khosrow II to choose the emperor. In a letter delivered by his ambassadors, Heraclius acknowledged the Persian empire as superior, described himself as Khosrow II's "obedient son, one who is eager to perform the services of your serenity in all things", and even called Khosrow II the "supreme emperor". Khosrow II nevertheless rejected the peace offer, and arrested Heraclius' ambassadors.

With the Persians at the very gate of Constantinople, Heraclius thought of abandoning the city and moving the capital to Carthage, but the powerful church figure Patriarch Sergius convinced him to stay. Safe behind the walls of Constantinople, Heraclius was able to sue for peace in exchange for an annual tribute of a thousand talents of gold, a thousand talents of silver, a thousand silk robes, a thousand horses, and a thousand virgins to the Persian King. The peace allowed him to rebuild the Empire's army by slashing non-military expenditure, devaluing the currency, and melting down, with the backing of Patriarch Sergius, Church treasures to raise the necessary funds to continue the war.

Byzantine counter-offensive and resurgence
On 4 April 622, Heraclius left Constantinople, entrusting the city to Sergius and general Bonus as regents of his son. He assembled his forces in Asia Minor, probably in Bithynia, and, after he revived their broken morale, he launched a new counter-offensive, which took on the character of a holy war; an acheiropoietos image of Christ was carried as a military standard.

The Roman army proceeded to Armenia, inflicted a defeat on an army led by a Persian-allied Arab chief, and then won a victory over the Persians under Shahrbaraz. Heraclius would stay on campaign for several years. On 25 March 624, he again left Constantinople with his wife, Martina, and his two children; after he celebrated Easter in Nicomedia on 15 April, he campaigned in the Caucasus, winning a series of victories in Armenia against Khosrow and his generals Shahrbaraz, Shahin, and Shahraplakan. In the same year the Visigoths succeeded in recapturing Cartagena, capital of the western Byzantine province of Spania, resulting in the loss of one of the few minor provinces that had been conquered by the armies of Justinian I. In 626 the Avars and Slavs supported by a Persian army commanded by Shahrbaraz, besieged Constantinople, but the siege ended in failure (the victory was attributed to the icons of the Virgin which were led in procession by Sergius about the walls of the city), while a second Persian army under Shahin suffered another crushing defeat at the hands of Heraclius's brother Theodore.

With the Persian war effort disintegrating, Heraclius was able to bring the Gokturks of the Western Turkic Khaganate, under Ziebel, who invaded Persian Transcaucasia. Heraclius exploited divisions within the Persian Empire, keeping Shahrbaraz neutral by convincing him that Khosrow had grown jealous of him and had ordered his execution. Late in 627 he launched a winter offensive into Mesopotamia, where, despite the desertion of his Turkish allies, he defeated the Persians under Rhahzadh at the Battle of Nineveh. Continuing south along the Tigris he sacked Khosrow's great palace at Dastagird and was only prevented from attacking Ctesiphon by the destruction of the bridges on the Nahrawan Canal. Discredited by this series of disasters, Khosrow was overthrown and killed in a coup led by his son Kavad II, who at once sued for peace, agreeing to withdraw from all occupied territories. In 629 Heraclius restored the True Cross to Jerusalem in a majestic ceremony.

Heraclius took for himself the ancient Persian title of "King of Kings" after his victory. Later on, starting in 629, he styled himself as Basileus, the Greek word for "sovereign", and that title was used by the Byzantine emperors for the next 800 years. The reason Heraclius chose this title over previous Roman terms such as Augustus has been attributed by some scholars to his Armenian origins.

Heraclius's defeat of the Persians ended a war that had been going on intermittently for almost 400 years and led to instability in the Persian Empire. Kavad II died only months after assuming the throne, plunging Persia into several years of dynastic turmoil and civil war. Ardashir III, Heraclius's ally Shahrbaraz, and Khosrow's daughters Boran and Azarmidokht all succeeded to the throne within months of each other. Only when Yazdgerd III, a grandson of Khosrow II, succeeded to the throne in 632 was there stability. But by then the Sasanid Empire was severely disorganised, having been weakened by years of war and civil strife over the succession to the throne.
The war had been devastating, and left the Byzantines in a much-weakened state. Within a few years both empires were overwhelmed by the onslaught of the Arabs, ultimately leading to the Arab conquest of Persia and the fall of the Sasanian dynasty in 651.

Byzantine–Arab Wars 

By 630, the Arabs had unified all the tribes of the Hijaz, previously too divided to pose a serious military challenge to the Byzantines or the Persians. They composed one of the most powerful states in the region. The first conflict between the Byzantines and the Arabs was the Battle of Mu'tah in September 629. A small Arabs skirmishing force attacked the province of Arabia in response to the Arabs ambassador's death at the hands of the Ghassanid Roman governor, but were repulsed. Since the engagement was a Byzantine victory, there was no apparent reason to make changes to the military organization of the region. The Roman military wasn't accustomed to fighting Arab armies at scale, much like the Islamic forces of Hijaz who had no prior experience in their engagements against the Romans. Even the Strategicon of Maurice, a manual of war praised for the variety of enemies it covers, does not mention warfare against Arabs at any length. The religious zeal of the Arab army, which was a recent development following the rise of Islam, ultimately contributed to the latter's success in its campaigns against the Romans.

The following year, the Arabs launched an offensive into the Arabah south of Lake Tiberias, taking al-Karak. Other raids penetrated into the Negev, reaching as far as Gaza. The Battle of Yarmouk in 636 resulted in a crushing defeat for the larger Byzantine army; within three years, the Levant had been lost again. Heraclius died of an illness on 11 February 641; and most of Egypt had fallen by that time as well.

Legacy

Looking back at the reign of Heraclius, scholars have credited him with many accomplishments. He enlarged the Empire, and his reorganization of the government and military were great successes. His attempts at religious harmony failed, but he succeeded in returning the True Cross, one of the holiest Christian relics, to Jerusalem.

Accomplishments
Although the territorial gains produced by his defeat of the Persians were lost to the advance of the Muslims, Heraclius still ranks among the great Roman emperors. His reforms of the government reduced the corruption which had taken hold in Phocas's reign, and he reorganized the military with great success. Ultimately, the reformed Imperial army halted the Muslims in Asia Minor and held on to Carthage for another 60 years, saving a core from which the empire's strength could be rebuilt.

The recovery of the eastern areas of the Roman Empire from the Persians once again raised the problem of religious unity centering on the understanding of the true nature of Christ. Most of the inhabitants of these provinces were Monophysites who rejected the Council of Chalcedon. Heraclius tried to promote a compromise doctrine called Monothelitism but this philosophy was rejected as heretical by both sides of the dispute. For this reason, Heraclius was viewed as a heretic and bad ruler by some later religious writers. After the Monophysite provinces were finally lost to the Muslims, Monotheletism rather lost its raison d'être and was eventually abandoned.

The Croats and Serbs of Byzantine Dalmatia initiated diplomatic relations and dependencies with Heraclius. The Serbs, who briefly lived in Macedonia, became foederati and were baptized at the request of Heraclius (before 626).  At his request, Pope John IV (640–642) sent Christian teachers and missionaries to Duke Porga and his Croats, who practiced Slavic paganism. He also created the office of sakellarios, a comptroller of the treasury.

Up to the 20th century he was credited with establishing the Thematic system but modern scholarship now points more to the 660s, under Constans II.

Edward Gibbon, in The History of the Decline and Fall of the Roman Empire, wrote:

Recovery of the True Cross
Heraclius was long remembered favourably by the Western church for his reputed recovery of the True Cross from the Persians. As Heraclius approached the Persian capital during the final stages of the war, Khosrow fled from his favourite residence, Dastagird near Baghdad, without offering resistance. Meanwhile, some of the Persian grandees freed Khosrow's eldest son Kavad II, who had been imprisoned by his father, and proclaimed him King on the night of 23–24 February, 628. Kavad, however, was mortally ill and was anxious that Heraclius should protect his infant son Ardeshir. So, as a goodwill gesture, he sent the True Cross with a negotiator in 628.

After a tour of the Empire, Heraclius returned the cross to Jerusalem on 21 March 629 or 630. For Christians of Western Medieval Europe, Heraclius was the "first crusader". The iconography of the emperor appeared in the sanctuary at Mont Saint-Michel (ca. 1060), and then it became popular, especially in France, the Italian Peninsula, and the Holy Roman Empire. The story was included in the Golden Legend, the famous 13th-century compendium of hagiography, and he is sometimes shown in art, as in The History of the True Cross sequence of frescoes painted by Piero della Francesca in Arezzo, and a similar sequence on a small altarpiece by Adam Elsheimer (Städel, Frankfurt). Both of these show scenes of Heraclius and Constantine I's mother Saint Helena, traditionally responsible for the excavation of the cross. The scene usually shown is Heraclius carrying the cross; according to the Golden Legend, he insisted on doing this as he entered Jerusalem, against the advice of the Patriarch. At first, when he was on horseback (shown above), the burden was too heavy, but after he dismounted and removed his crown it became miraculously light, and the barred city gate opened of its own accord.

Local tradition suggests that the Late Antique Colossus of Barletta depicts Heraclius.

Some scholars disagree with this narrative, Professor Constantin Zuckerman going as far as to suggest that the True Cross was actually lost, and that the wood contained in the allegedly-still-sealed reliquary brought to Jerusalem by Heraclius in 629 was a fake. In his analysis, the hoax was designed to serve the political purposes of both Heraclius and his former foe, the Persian general Shahrbaraz.

Islamic view of Heraclius

In early Islamic and Arab histories, Heraclius is the most popular Roman emperor, who is discussed at length. Owing to his role as Roman emperor at the time Islam emerged, he is remembered in Arabic literature, such as the Islamic hadith and sira.

The Swahili Utendi wa Tambuka, an epic poem composed in 1728 at Pate Island (off the shore of present-day Kenya) and depicting the wars between the Muslims and Byzantines from the former's point of view, is also known as Kyuo kya Hereḳali ("The Book of Heraclius"). In that work, Heraclius is portrayed as declining the Prophet's request to renounce his belief in Christianity: he is therefore defeated by the Muslim forces.

In Muslim tradition, he is seen as a just ruler of great piety, who had direct contact with the emerging Islamic forces. The 14th-century scholar Ibn Kathir (d. 1373) went even further, stating that "Heraclius was one of the wisest men and among the most resolute, shrewd, deep and opinionated of kings. He ruled the Romans with great leadership and splendor." Historians such as Nadia Maria El-Cheikh and Lawrence Conrad note that Islamic histories even go so far as claiming that Heraclius recognized Islam as the true faith and Muhammad as its prophet, by comparing Islam to Christianity.

Islamic historians often cite a letter in which they claim Heraclius wrote to Muhammad: "I have received your letter with your ambassador and I testify that you are the messenger of God found in our New Testament. Jesus, son of Mary, announced you." According to the Muslim sources reported by El-Cheikh, he tried to convert the ruling class of the Empire, but they resisted so strongly that he reversed course and claimed that he was just testing their faith in Christianity. El-Cheikh notes that these accounts of Heraclius add "little to our historical knowledge" of the emperor; rather, they are an important part of "Islamic kerygma," attempting to legitimize Muhammad's status as a prophet.

Most Western academic historians view such traditions as biased and proclamatory and of little historical value. Furthermore, they argue that any messengers sent by Muhammad to Heraclius would not have received an imperial audience or recognition. According to Kaegi, there is no evidence outside of Islamic sources to suggest Heraclius ever heard of Islam, and it is possible that he and his advisors actually viewed the Muslims as some special sect of Jews.

Family

Heraclius was married twice: first to Fabia Eudokia, a daughter of Rogatus, and then to his niece Martina. He had two children with Fabia (Eudoxia Epiphania and Emperor Constantine III) and at least nine with Martina, most of whom were sickly children. Of Martina's children at least two were disabled, which was seen as punishment for the illegality of the marriage: Fabius (Flavius) had a paralyzed neck and Theodosios was a deaf-mute.  The latter married Nike, daughter of the Persian general Shahrbaraz, or daughter of Niketas, cousin of Heraclius.

Two of Heraclius's children would become emperor: Heraclius Constantine (Constantine III), his son with Eudokia, and Martina's son Heraclius (Heraclonas). Constantine was crowned co-emperor (augustus) on 22 January 613, at the age of 8 months. Heraclonas was made caesar on 1 January 632, aged 6, and was later crowned augustus on 4 July 638. They ruled for a few months in 641, but where eventually succeeded by Constans II, the son of Constantine III, by the end of the year.

Heraclius had at least one illegitimate son, John Athalarichos, who conspired against Heraclius with his cousin, the magister Theodorus, and the Armenian noble David Saharuni. When Heraclius discovered the plot, he had Athalarichos's nose and hands cut off, and he was exiled to Prinkipo, one of the Princes' Islands. Theodorus received the same treatment, but was sent to Gaudomelete (possibly modern-day Gozo Island) with additional instructions to cut off one leg.

During the last years of Heraclius's life, it became evident that a struggle was taking place between Heraclius Constantine and Martina, who was trying to position her son Heraclonas to assume the throne. When Heraclius died, he devised the empire to both Heraclius Constantine and Heraclonas to rule jointly with Martina as empress.

Family tree

See also

 Cathedral of Mren
 Flavia gens
 Non-Muslim interactants with Muslims during Muhammad's era
 Revolt against Heraclius

Annotations

References

Sources

Further reading

External links

 "Heraclius" at De Imperatoribus Romanis (Archive) – online encyclopedia of Roman Emperors

 
575 births
610s in the Byzantine Empire
620s in the Byzantine Empire
630s in the Byzantine Empire
640s in the Byzantine Empire
641 deaths
7th-century Byzantine emperors
Armenian Byzantine emperors
Byzantine Cappadocians
Byzantine generals
Byzantine people of the Arab–Byzantine wars
Dhul-Qarnayn
Imperial Roman consuls
Leaders who took power by coup
People of the Byzantine–Sasanian War of 602–628
People of the Muslim conquest of the Levant
People of the Roman–Sasanian Wars